Peter Warlow Gatehouse (born 3 May 1936) is a former Welsh cricketer and pharmacist. Gatehouse was a left-arm fast-medium bowler and tail-end right-handed batsman who played for Glamorgan from 1957 to 1962. He was born at Caerphilly, Glamorgan.

Gatehouse made his first-class debut for Glamorgan against Nottinghamshire at Stradey Park, Llanelli, in the 1957 County Championship. He made eighteen further first-class appearances for the county, the last of which came against Kent at the St Lawrence Ground, Canterbury. A bowler, Gatehouse took 53 wickets in his nineteen first-class matches, at an average of 29.26. His best bowling figures of 7/94 came against Middlesex at Lord's in 1958. He also took an additional three wickets in this match, giving him the only ten-wicket match haul of his career. He took a second five wicket haul against Somerset in the same season. A tailend batsman, Gatehouse scored a total of 85 runs at a batting average of 5.66, with a high score of 20.

While playing for Glamorgan, Gatehouse studied for a Ph.D. in pharmacy at Cardiff University. It was in this profession that he chose to pursue a career, thereby ending his first-class cricket career.

References

External links
Peter Gatehouse at ESPNcricinfo
Peter Gatehouse at CricketArchive

1936 births
Living people
Alumni of Cardiff University
British pharmacists
Cricketers from Caerphilly County Borough
Glamorgan cricketers
Sportspeople from Caerphilly
Welsh cricketers